Abigael Bohórquez (12 March 1936 — 28 November 1995) was a Mexican poet and playwright.

Life and career
Bohórquez was born in Caborca, Sonora, Mexico, on 12 March 1936. Many of his works are social criticisms. He was also one of the first writers to deal with the theme of homosexuality in Mexican poetry. His first book was Ensayos Poéticos in 1955, when he was just nineteen years old with no formal training. He studied the dramatic arts at the Instituto Nacional de Bellas Artes (INBA) and the Instituto Cinematográfico  de la Asociación Nacional de Actores. He was influenced by the much older gay poet Carlos Pellicer while living in Mexico City.

Shortly after, his work began to gain recognitions such as the Primer Concurso Latinoamericano XEW for his poetry and various from the Universidad Nacional Autónoma de México.  He became a professor at the Academia de Arte Dramático of the Universidad de Sonora and director for two theatre groups. Bohórquez died in Hermosillo in 1995 after writing eighteen works of poetry and plays. Some of these include Poesía I teatro, La hoguera en el pañuelo, Canción de amor y muerte por Rubén Jaramillo, and Las amarras terrestres.

Bohórquez died on 28 November 1995 in Hermosillo, Sonora.

Further reading

 Efrén Ortiz Dominguez, Sublime abyección: La poesía de Abigael Bohórquez y de Juan Bañuelos, City University of New York

References

Mexican dramatists and playwrights
Mexican male poets
1936 births
1995 deaths
Writers from Sonora
20th-century Mexican poets
20th-century Mexican dramatists and playwrights
Male dramatists and playwrights
20th-century Mexican male writers
People from Caborca
Academic staff of Universidad de Sonora